Ice is a 1970 American drama film directed by Robert Kramer.

Plot
An underground revolutionary group carries out urban guerrilla attacks against a fictionalized fascist regime in the United States, while struggling against internal strife. This is intermixed with sequences that explain the philosophy of radical action and play down the melodrama inherent in the thriller genre.

Cast
 Robert Kramer - Robert
 Leo Braudy - Vladimir

See also
 List of American films of 1970

References

1970 films
1970 drama films
American drama films
1970s English-language films
1970s American films
English-language drama films